A by-election for the seat of Vaucluse in the New South Wales Legislative Assembly was held on 31 May 1986. The by-election was triggered by the resignation of Liberal member and Deputy Leader Rosemary Foot.

The by-election for the seats of Pittwater was held on the same day.

Dates

Results

Liberal member Rosemary Foot resigned.

See also
Electoral results for the district of Vaucluse
List of New South Wales state by-elections

Notes

References

1986 elections in Australia
New South Wales state by-elections
1980s in New South Wales